Guy Armand Feutchine (born 18 November 1976) is a Cameroonian former professional footballer who played as a midfielder.

Club career
Born in Douala, Feutchine started his career at Union Douala in 1994, before moving to Polish side Wisła Kraków in 1996. After 21 games and three goals in one and a half seasons, Feutchine moved to fellow Kraków club Cracovia for the rest of the 1997/98 season. Feutchine then moved to PAS Giannina in Greece where he won the Beta Ethniki in his second season, before moving to PAOK midway through his third season. Feutchine went on to play for PAOK for five and a half seasons before moving to St. Gallen for two seasons. Feutchine then returned to Greece in the summer of 2008, signing with Diagoras, and after 18 months to French side Colmar for the remainder of the 2009–10 season, winning the 2009–10 Championnat de France amateur Group A. Feutchine left France in the summer of 2010 and signed for Three Time Azerbaijan Premier League champions Kapaz, appearing 78 times for them in all competitions before leaving on 19 January,2013, to return to Greece with Kallithea. He made 15 appearances without scoring or assisting after retiring on 1 July 2013.

International career
Feutchine was a Cameroonian international from 2001 to 2007, and was part of the 2006 Africa Cup of Nations squad, featuring in the 2–0 win over DR Congo. His first goal for Cameroon came in their 2–0 2006 World Cup qualifying win over the Ivory Coast on 4 July 2004. His second goal for Cameroon came in their 3–0 2008 Africa Cup of Nations qualification away victory over Rwanda on 3 September 2006.

Managing career
He managed the Greek club Irodotos from 2018 to 2019.
On January 7, 2021, he was appointed as a rehab coach for AO Trikala a club from Greece.

Career statistics

Club

International

International goals
Scores and results list Cameroon's goal tally first, score column indicates score after each Feutchine goal.

Honours

Club
PAOK
 Greek Cup: 2000–01, 2002–03

'''Colmar
 Championnat de France amateur: 2009–10 Group A

References

1976 births
Living people
Cameroonian footballers
Cameroonian expatriate footballers
Wisła Kraków players
MKS Cracovia (football) players
PAS Giannina F.C. players
PAOK FC players
FC St. Gallen players
SR Colmar players
Ekstraklasa players
Swiss Super League players
Super League Greece players
Championnat National 2 players
Association football midfielders
Cameroon international footballers
2006 Africa Cup of Nations players
Expatriate footballers in Poland
Expatriate footballers in Greece
Expatriate footballers in Switzerland
Expatriate footballers in Azerbaijan
Expatriate footballers in France
Cameroonian expatriate sportspeople in Poland
Cameroonian expatriate sportspeople in Greece
Cameroonian expatriate sportspeople in Switzerland
Cameroonian expatriate sportspeople in Azerbaijan
Cameroonian expatriate sportspeople in France
Diagoras F.C. players
Kallithea F.C. players
Football League (Greece) players
Azerbaijan Premier League players
Cameroonian football managers
Irodotos FC managers